Mounir Benamadi (born April 5, 1982) is an Algerian judoka, who played for the half-lightweight category. He won a gold medal for his division at the 2007 All-Africa Games in Algiers, and silver at the 2008 African Judo Championships in Agadir.

Benamadi represented Algeria at the 2008 Summer Olympics in Beijing, where he competed for the men's half-lightweight class (66 kg). He defeated Australia's Steven Brown in the first preliminary round, before losing out his next match by a single koka to Uzbekistan's Mirali Sharipov.

References

External links

NBC 2008 Olympics profile

Algerian male judoka
Living people
Olympic judoka of Algeria
Judoka at the 2008 Summer Olympics
1982 births
African Games gold medalists for Algeria
African Games medalists in judo
Competitors at the 2007 All-Africa Games
21st-century Algerian people